Musadiq Ahmed (born 1 May 1989) is a Pakistani cricketer who plays for Khyber Pakhtunkhwa. In September 2019, he was named in Khyber Pakhtunkhwa's squad for the 2019–20 Quaid-e-Azam Trophy tournament. In January 2021, he was named in Khyber Pakhtunkhwa's squad for the 2020–21 Pakistan Cup. On the opening day of the tournament, he scored 103 not out, his first century in List A cricket.

References

External links
 

1989 births
Living people
Pakistani cricketers
Peshawar cricketers
Khyber Pakhtunkhwa cricketers
People from Nowshera District